Bald Mountain (9150 feet, 2789 m) is a mountain in the western United States in south central Idaho, adjacent to the city of Ketchum in Blaine County. The mountain has one of the higher summits of the Smoky Mountains of Idaho, located in the Sawtooth National Forest. The forested Smoky Mountains were named for their propensity for summer forest fires.

Sun Valley skiing

It is the primary ski mountain of the Sun Valley ski resort, and renowned for its lengthy runs at a uniform gradient, at varying levels of difficulty, and with little wind.

With a base elevation of  along the Big Wood River at River Run, Baldy's vertical drop is  along its northeast face. It is served by fourteen ski lifts (an eight-person gondola, seven high-speed quads, three triples, two doubles, and a surface); Baldy has more uphill capacity per skier than any other ski area.

The slope ratings are 36% easiest, 42% more difficult, and 22% most difficult. These ratings are relative, not absolute; much of the "easiest" terrain on Bald Mountain would be rated as "intermediate" at most ski areas, as the beginner areas are on the gentler and smaller Dollar Mountain.

Sun Valley's Bald Mountain is independent of the Bald Mountain Ski Area, a modest ski hill near Pierce in Clearwater County in north central Idaho.

Ski runs 
Easiest (Green Circle Runs)
Lower River Run 
Lower College 
Olympic Ridge 
Olympic Lane 
42nd Street
Upper College 
Broadway
Broadway Face
Lilly Marlane
Maiden Lane
Mid Warm Springs
Lower Warm Springs
Lower Greyhawk
Sunset Strip
Roundhouse Slope
Roundhouse Lane

More Difficult (Blue Square Runs)
Mid River Run
Flying Squirrel
Upper Canyon
Blue Grouse
Cutoff
Christmas Lane
Wolverton
Christmas Ridge
Upper Janss Pass
Upper French Dip
Upper Can-Can
Graduate
Lower Cozy
Lower Limelight
Warm Springs Face
Upper Warm Springs
Race Arena
Mid Hemingway
Mid Greyhawk
Mid Cozy
Lower Picabo's Street
Lower Hemingway
I-80
Brick's Island
Upper Canyon
Mid River Run
Lower Canyon
Lower Blue Grouse

Most Difficult (Black Diamond Runs)
Sleeping Bear
Exhibition
Inhibition
Olympic (Not to be confused with Olympic Lane or Olympic Ridge)
Fire Trail
Mayday Bowl
Lookout Bowl
Easter Bowl
Little Easter Bowl
Rock Garden
Upper Limelight
Upper Hemingway
Upper Picabo's Street
Upper Greyhawk
Upper Cozy
Mid Picabo's Street
Mid Limelight
International
Arnold's Run
Upper River Run
Upper Holiday
Mid Holiday
Lower Holiday

In media
In the NBC miniseries, 10.5: Apocalypse, this mountain is an extinct volcano that erupts with devastating force. An avalanche of hot gases and ash cascaded down the mountain and buried everything, including the mountain's ski areas, and the towns of Sun Valley, Ketchum, and Hailey. Multiple rescue teams arrived at the scene and dug through the debris caused by Bald Mountain's eruption, looking for any survivors.

References

External links

 Sun Valley.com - Bald Mountain - ski report
 Idaho Summits.com - photo of Bald Mountain from Proctor Mountain
 Ski Lifts.org – photos of Sun Valley's lifts
 Ski Map.org – vintage maps – Sun Valley (Bald Mtn)

Mountains of Idaho
Mountains of Blaine County, Idaho
Sawtooth National Forest
Ski areas and resorts in Idaho
Tourist attractions in Blaine County, Idaho
Sun Valley, Idaho